Walter Maidstone was a medieval Bishop of Worcester. He was nominated on 1 October 1313 and consecrated on 7 October 1313. He died on 28 March 1317.

Citations

References

External links

 

Bishops of Worcester
14th-century English Roman Catholic bishops
1317 deaths
Year of birth unknown